Chondrostoma angorense, sometimes called the Ankara nase or Black Sea nase,  is a species of ray-finned fish in the genus Chondrostoma which is endemic to northern Anatolia, Turkey.

References

 

Chondrostoma
Endemic fauna of Turkey
Fish described in 1987